Lula or Luiz Inácio Lula da Silva (born 1945) is a Brazilian politician who is the President of Brazil from 2003 to 2011 and 2023 to present.

Lula or LULA may also refer to:

Geography
Lula, Sardinia, a small town in the Province of Nuoro, Italy
Lula, Levice District, a village in Slovakia
Lula, Georgia, a small city in the U.S.
Lula, Mississippi, a small town in the U.S.

People
Lula (singer) (born 1973), German singer
 Lula (footballer, born 1946), Brazilian footballer
Lula (footballer, born 1922) (1922–1972), Brazilian football coach
LuLa, Hiro Todo’s name for the FEMM band

Other uses
Lula (avocado), an avocado cultivar from Florida
Lula (magazine), a British culture and fashion biannual
Lula (series), a series of Windows games
LuLa (web site) or Luminous Landscape, a photography site
Lula (Dave the Barbarian), a character in Dave the Barbarian
Lusoga Language Authority (LULA)
Lula, Son of Brazil, a 2010 film
Lula, o filho do Brasil (soundtrack)

People with the given name
Lula Barbosa (born 1970), Brazilian beach volleyball player
Lula Carvalho (born 1977), Brazilian cinematographer
Lula Côrtes (1949–2011), Brazilian musician
Lula Ferreira (born 1951), Brazilian basketball coach
Lula Galvão (born 1962), Brazilian guitarist
Lula Mae Hardaway (1930–2006), American songwriter, Grammy Award nominee, mother of Stevie Wonder
Lula Greene Richards (1849–1944), American poet

See also
"My Lula Gal", a folk song
Lulu (disambiguation)